Justin 'Brash' Brooker (born 8 August 1977) is an Indigenous Australian professional rugby league footballer who played in the 1990s and 2000s.

Playing career
Justin Brooker played in the Campbelltown League with the Minto Cobras, then a move to the country in the Group 6 League where he won titles in U'16 and First grade. Brooker had recently turned 21 when he made his début with the Sydney City Roosters, scoring two tries on debut. He was again named at fullback for the next two weeks.

In 1999, Brooker joined the Western Suburbs Magpies. He played mostly at centre. Despite a poor season from the Magpies, he scored 9 tries, including 2 doubles and was named Supporters player of the year. He was the last player to score for the Magpies before they merged with Balmain Tigers in 2000.

Brooker left Australia and played in the Super League for the Bradford Bulls and Wakefield Trinity Wildcats before returning to Australia to play for the South Sydney Rabbitohs. Brooker retired for religious reason and returned to the Picton Magpies in the Group 6 Rugby League competition. With a year remaining on his Contract at South Sydney Rabbitohs In September 2002 it was announced that Brooker retired from football to pursue another career.

References

External links
2001 Super League Team-by-team guide

Sources
 

1977 births
Living people
Australian rugby league players
Indigenous Australian rugby league players
Sydney Roosters players
Western Suburbs Magpies players
Bradford Bulls players
Wakefield Trinity players
South Sydney Rabbitohs players
Rugby league centres
Rugby league fullbacks
Rugby league players from Sydney
Rugby league wingers
Place of birth missing (living people)